The Greatest Country in the World is a Canadian drama film, directed by Ky Nam Le Duc and released in 2019. Set in a reality in which Canada has just elected a far right government that is threatening to deport refugees and immigrants, the film centres on Hiên (Nguyen Thanh Tri), a Vietnamese immigrant who is preparing to move back to Vietnam, and Alex (Mickaël Gouin), the boyfriend of Hiên's daughter Phuong (Alice Tran) who has already left the country, as they help Junior (Stanley Junior Jean-Baptiste) try to locate his mother Roseline (Schelby Jean-Baptiste) when she disappears.

The film premiered at the Festival du nouveau cinéma in 2019. It was screened at the Reelworld Film Festival in 2020, where it won the Audience Choice Award, and at the 2020 Toronto Reel Asian International Film Festival, before going into commercial release in 2021.

Nguyen Thanh Tri received a Prix Iris nomination for Best Actor at the 24th Quebec Cinema Awards in 2022.

References

External links

2019 films
Canadian drama films
Films shot in Quebec
Films set in Quebec
Films about Vietnamese Canadians
Quebec films
French-language Canadian films
English-language Canadian films
2010s Canadian films